An immortal, in MUDs and particularly DikuMUDs, is an administrator and/or developer of the game, often a player who has achieved "immortal" status by achievements within the game world.  It is frequently abbreviated "imm" or "immort".  Some MUDs have an option for players who have become immortals to "remort", returning to mortal status with advantages.

Other commonly used terms with the same or related meanings are developer ("dev"), administrator ("admin"), wizard ("wiz"), God, and implementer ("imp"); the last two most often refer to the system's owner or owners.  "Coder" is often found as a position distinct from both immortal and implementor, with responsibilities centered on development of the virtual world server software, as opposed to the content creation that is typical of immortals who perform development at all.  Immortals dedicated to content development may be called "builders" or "creators", especially in a project that uses the "coder" role.

References

MUD terminology